Events from the 1650s in the Kingdom of Scotland.

Incumbents
Monarch – Charles II (until his disposition in 1651)
 Commonwealth of England from 1651 until the Restoration in 1660 which reinstates Charles II.

Events

 1650:
 21 May - James Graham, 1st Marquess of Montrose executed in Edinburgh after his defeat at the Battle of Carbisdale.
 29 June - "the Lord General Cromwell went out of London towards the North: and the news of him marching Northward much startled the Scots". Oliver Cromwell leads the New Model Army to Edinburgh.
 3 September - Battle of Dunbar takes place between Cromwell's Army and the Scottish Covenanters. Cromwell's army wins and the battle results in southern Scotland surrendering to England; it is administered from Dalkeith.
 1651:
 1 January - Charles II crowned King of Scotland at Scone Palace.
 20 July - Battle of Inverkeithing: The English Parliamentarian New Model Army, under Major-General John Lambert, defeats a Scottish Covenanter army acting on behalf of Charles II, led by Sir John Brown of Fordell.
 1 September - Siege of Dundee ends with the English Parliamentarian army, under General Monck, decisively defeating Covenanters in the last battle of the Wars of the Three Kingdoms in Scotland.
 3 September - Battle of Worcester takes place after Charles II has raised an army (largely from Scotland) and invaded England. It results in his defeat by Cromwell and the king escaping abroad.
 1652: 17 June - A large fire breaks out in Glasgow, which destroys around a third of the city and leaves approximately 1,000 families homeless.
 1653: 16 December - Cromwell is made Lord Protector of England, Scotland and Ireland.
 1654:
12 April - Cromwell creates a union between England and Scotland, with Scottish representation in the Parliament of England.
5 May - Cromwell's Act of Grace, which pardons the people of Scotland for any crimes they may have committed during the Wars of the Three Kingdoms, is proclaimed in Edinburgh.
 1658: 3 September - Cromwell dies and the title of Lord Protector passes to his son, Richard Cromwell.
 1659:
 25 May - Richard Cromwell forced to resign as Lord Protector.
 Heriot's Hospital opens in Edinburgh.

Publications

1655 - History of the Church and State of Scotland by John Spottiswoode.

Births

1650:
 Sir James Dalrymple, 1st Baronet, writer and Principal Clerk of Session (d. 1719)
 George Brown, inventor and arithmetician (d. 1730)
 Henry Erskine, 3rd Lord Cardross, Covenanter (d. 1693)
 1654: 23 November - George Watson, accountant (d. 1733)
 1658: 11 April - James Hamilton, 4th Duke of Hamilton, nobleman (d. 1712)
 1659
 1 January - Margaret Wemyss, 3rd Countess of Wemyss, noble (d. 1705)
 3 June - David Gregory, mathematician and astronomer (d. 1708)
 13 September - Claud Hamilton, 4th Earl of Abercorn, Scottish and Irish peer (k. in action 1691)

Deaths

1650:
 21 May – James Graham, 1st Marquess of Montrose (b. 1612)
 29 October - David Calderwood, divine and historian (b. 1575)
1654: Alexander Ross, writer (b. c.1590)

References

 1650 in Scotland